This is a complete list of the presidents of the Senate of the Czech Republic.

References

See also
Senate of the Czech Republic

Czech Republic
Lists of members of the Senate of the Czech Republic